Road to paradise may refer to:

 Washington State Route 706, also called the Road to Paradise
 Road to Paradise: Anthology 1978–83, a compilation album by British melodic rock band Magnum
 Road to Paradise (film), a 1930 all-talking pre-code drama film
 The Road to Paradise, a 1930 musical comedy film
 The Road to Paradise (1956 film), a 1956 French-German romantic comedy film

See also
 Paradise Road (disambiguation)